The Fifth is a skyscraper under construction in Des Moines, Iowa. Developed by Mandelbaum Properties, upon completion in 2022, it will be the second tallest building in Iowa. The building will consist of a movie theater, hotel, parking garage, retail, and residential space. Construction started in late 2018 and is expected to finish at the end of 2022.

History 
The building is located on Fifth Avenue between Court Avenue and Walnut Street in downtown Des Moines, and will be Iowa's second tallest skyscraper when completed. The building is being constructed in three phases. Phase one is a 12 story parking garage which is currently under construction. Phases two and three are the tower and theater. 

In April 2016, the Des Moines City Council approved a preliminary development agreement to allow the 32 story tower to be constructed for a cost of around $107 million. At that point, the plan was to include 200 luxury condos, a movie theater, climbing facility, jazz club, daycare, and office space. The climbing facility, jazz club and daycare facility have since been removed from the project. A hotel was later added. 

A vote to begin construction occurred in September 2018. The developers had until October 2019 to start construction, and had to finish by September 2021.

The building's estimated completion date was delayed in March 2019. The delays were apparently caused by a growth in scope of the project, resulting in final permitting and design approvals. The tower grew in height to 39 stories at first with an estimated cost of $170 million. Most recent plans have the cost at an estimated to be $180 million after a 40th floor was added and will include a boutique hotel managed by 21c Hotels. They are an art based hotel chain that has a rotating art gallery open to the public 24/7/365. The tower building is supposed to take three years to finish, and the theater two years. Alamo theaters of Omaha, NE, are locked into an agreement with the developer to manage the theater. Alamo Theaters are a dine-in movie theater. The overall construction project will include ground floor retail in the parking garage and a restaurant on the first floor of the theater. 

The buildings future is now in jeopardy.

See also 
List of tallest buildings in Iowa

References

External links
 
 Facebook Page

Skyscraper office buildings in Des Moines, Iowa